The sack of Cullera occurred on either 15 or 20 May 1550 when the Ottoman general Dragut landed in Cullera, Valencia and sacked the city taking away many inhabitants in slavery.

Dragut had just assaulted Benalmádena, Benissa and Sant Joan d'Alacant with 27 galleys, he then sailed to Valencia which he sacked before his assault on Cullera.

Dragut attacked Cullera at night with 300 men. Dragut sacked the city, seized goods from the people and took almost all of the inhabitants of the city as slaves. He kept the captives in a cave before taking them to a slave market in Algiers. This same cave now has a statue of Dragut and a museum commemorating his attack.

After his assault on Cullera he made his way to Majorca where he sacked Pollença, killing or capturing 130 people in the process. He then attacked Barenys in Sardinia where he destroyed the castle, set fire to the crops and took many captives.

References

1550 in Spain
Barbary pirates
Mediterranean port cities and towns in Spain